Akkiraz is a village in the Çıldır District, Ardahan Province, Turkey. Its population is 206 (2021).

References

Villages in Çıldır District